Queensborough Bridge is a highway bridge in New Westminster, British Columbia. It was built in 1960 by John Laing and Son (Canada) for the City of New Westminster and cost $4 million (equivalent to $37.5 million in 2022). The bridge spans the north arm of the Fraser River for road access from the main part of New Westminster to the suburb of Queensborough at the east end of Lulu Island, giving the bridge its name. 

It has since become a part of Highway 91A feeder to Highway 91 to the south. The Queensborough was a toll bridge costing 25 cents to cross until the bridge was bought by the provincial government in November 1966. The last person to pay the toll was then Premier W. A. C. Bennett, who paid 25 cents at 12:01 AM on Sunday, November 19, 1966. 
 
Six spans of the bridge were demolished and replaced in 1984 and 1985 to allow for a curve alignment on its southern approach to Queensborough Connector.
In 2009, the interchange with Marine Way and Stewardson Way saw improving, including the trumpet loop being flipped to its current rotation.

See also

 List of bridges in Canada
 List of crossings of the Fraser River

References

 Bridges of Greater Vancouver
 

Bridges in Greater Vancouver
Bridges completed in 1960
Bridges over the Fraser River
Buildings and structures in New Westminster
Road bridges in British Columbia
Former toll bridges in Canada